The OK Thing to Do on Sunday Afternoon Is to Toddle in the Zoo (在動物園散步才是正經事) is the debut album by the Hong Kong-based indie pop band My Little Airport in 2004. The title song is adapted from an 1871 Victorian street ballad and music hall monologue "Walking in the Zoo" by The Great Vance.

Track listing 
 "coka, i'm fine"
 "the ok thing to do on sunday afternoon is to toddle in the zoo" (在動物園散步才是正經事)
 "victor, fly me to stafford"
 "edward, had you ever thought that the end of the world would come on 20.9.01"
 "audrey, about scenery" (柯德莉，關於風景)
 "my little banana "
 "josephine's shop"
 "faye wong, about your eyebrows" (王菲，關於你的眉)
 "you don't wanna be my girlfriend, phoebe "
 "dee, it may all end tomorrow "

References

My Little Airport albums
2004 debut albums